Edward Lane (1908 – after 1935) was an English professional footballer who played as a defender. After short spells with West Bromwich Albion and Notts County, he joined Cardiff City where he made 34 appearances during the 1934–35 season before being released.

References

1908 births
Date of death missing
English footballers
West Bromwich Albion F.C. players
Notts County F.C. players
Cardiff City F.C. players
English Football League players
Association football fullbacks